KETR (88.9 FM) is a 100-kW noncommercial broadcast FM radio station operation in Commerce, Texas, licensed to Texas A&M University-Commerce. A member of the National Public Radio network, the station serves nearly 250,000 Northeast Texas homes. The staff is composed of radio professionals and  Texas A&M-Commerce students who major in either journalism or mass communication studies. KETR also produces original long-form and short-form radio programming.

History
KETR began in the early 1970s as the director of the East Texas State University radio-television program, Dr. David Rigney, developed an FCC application for an FM station that would be a teaching laboratory for students. KETR's first broadcast went on the air on April 7, 1975. The station operated in a former classroom on the first floor of the Journalism Building, with Phil Ebensberger, a veteran Texas commercial radio broadcaster, as general manager and morning-show host. The weekday programming originally emphasized local news, information, and middle-of-the-road music from early-morning sign-on to early afternoon; classical music in the early afternoon (this was soon replaced by jazz); National Public Radio’s All Things Considered in the late afternoon; various public affairs programs in the early evening, including live broadcasts of Commerce City Commission meetings; and Freeform, a student-hosted rock music program from 9 pm to midnight.  Weekend programs predominantly featured classical music or opera, such as the long-running Texaco Metropolitan Opera broadcasts.

In 1977, the station moved from its quarters in the Journalism Building to new studios in the Performing Arts Center, where it shared facilities with the Radio-TV program.  KETR remained in the Performing Arts Center until it moved to new facilities in Binnion Hall in 2008. In the early 1980s, after Ebensberger departed, general manager Bill Oellermann obtained FCC approval and a grant to raise KETR’s tower height and to increase power from about 7,500 watts to 100,000 watts.  This increased the station’s broadcast range from about 20 miles to 75 miles. After moving away from National Public Radio programming in the mid-1980s, KETR has recently rejoined NPR and once again features All Things Considered and Morning Edition, among other NPR programs.  KETR was one of the original stations carrying Morning Edition when it debuted in 1979.

Local programs
KETR has several programs that focus on Commerce and the Northeast Texas area. Counties that are typically covered with local news in addition to Hunt County, where Commerce is located, are neighboring Rockwall, Collin, Fannin, Hopkins, Delta, and Rains Counties.

Among the local shows are:
Notably Texan' is focused on Texas music and Texas musicians with host Matt Meinke. Blacklands Café, hosted by John Mark Dempsey, is a news show that features 5- to 7-minute interviews in a radio coffee shop that focuses on local issues. North by Northeast is a weekly call-in show presenting "Stories that matter to Northeast Texas". Topics include development, education, health care, the environment, and the economy. Sports and fine arts are also featured.Outdoors With Luke Clayton, hosted by Hunter and Angler Luke Clayton, focuses on hunting, angling, and outdoor activity.Lions After Dark, hosted by various A&M-Commerce students, features music line-ups and interviews with other students on campus, usually regarding campus life.Buried is a podcast created by host/reporter George Hale and KETR General Manager Jerrod Knight, a documentary-style podcast that uncovers details about the case of Carey Mae Parker, a young rural-Texas mother of three who disappeared 19 years before being reported missing.

National and other nonlocal programsMorning EditionAll Things ConsideredBBC World ServiceSunday BaroqueTED Radio HourTexas StandardTexas MattersBullseye with Jesse Thorn''

Sports programming
KETR sports programming began in the fall of 1975, with student-produced broadcasts of Commerce High School Tigers football. Ebensberger and former ETSU All-American quarterback Sam McCord served as the voices of ETSU Lions football. The first Commerce Tigers broadcast featured the Tigers playing at rival Honey Grove, with future ETSU All-American and NFL quarterback Wade Wilson leading the Commerce offense. The first college football broadcast was the Lions’ 42-10 win over Prairie View A&M in the Cotton Bowl. KETR also broadcast Commerce Tigers basketball and A&M-Commerce Lion basketball, continuing to this day. KETR followed the Lions to NAIA basketball tournament appearances in Kansas City in 1977 and 1978. KETR serves as the flagship station for the Lion Sports Network. The station covers Texas A&M-Commerce football, A&M-Commerce men's and women's basketball, and Commerce High School football. Longtime Texas sports Broadcaster Charlie Chitwood serves as play-by-play announcer and TAMUC alumnus Brock Callaway provides color commentary.

Station coverage
The station is typically received well in an 80-mile radius in all directions. The station's signal can easily be heard west to Dallas, north into Hugo, Oklahoma, southeast to Canton, Texas, and east to Mount Vernon. The quality of the signal can sometimes be affected by topographical anomalies such as lakes or hills; areas north and west are typically not affected due to the generally flat topography. Too, the signal is simulcast globally via online stream at the station's website, which is accessible on most internet-connected devices.

References

External links
 KETR official website

NPR member stations
ETR
Radio stations established in 1975
Texas A&M University–Commerce